The Miracle of Bern is a 2003 film by Sönke Wortmann, which tells the story of a German family (particularly of a young boy and his depressed ex-POW father) and the unexpected West German miracle victory in the 1954 World Cup Final in Bern, Switzerland.

The film can be regarded as a portrait of post-war Germany. With over 6 million cinema visitors, it is one of Germany's best-selling films. Among those attending the première were Chancellor Gerhard Schröder, Peer Steinbrück, Minister-President of North Rhine-Westphalia, and Otto Schily, Federal Minister of the Interior (a position whose holder is also informally known as Minister for Sports).

Since November 2014, Hamburg's new musical theatre  is home to a successful musical production of the same name.

Plot
Richard, a coal miner from Essen, returns after eleven years of being a Soviet prisoner of war in Siberia. In the meantime, his wife, two sons, and one daughter have reached a minimum standard of living without him. When he is unexpectedly repatriated in 1954, he has severe problems in reintegrating himself with his family and country. His wife is running a small bar, his elder son has become a Communist challenging his father's ideals of the Nazi time, his daughter flirts with British soldiers who are his former enemies, while his 11-year-old son Matthias, who never knew his father, admires a local football hero instead, Helmut Rahn of Rot-Weiß Essen.

While Richard is initially very stern about Matthias' love for football, he gradually softens such that, on the night before the final game, father and son drive to Bern to see the match.

An additional plot of the movie is the personal triumph of Helmut Rahn, for whom Matthias becomes a lucky mascot. Rahn, nicknamed "The Boss", has a successful record at club level, though is rarely chosen to play at national level in trainer Sepp Herberger's team.

A third more light-hearted comic relief story line revolves around the fictional sports reporter Paul Ackermann and his wife, who travel to the World Cup despite their fundamentally different views on the importance of football.

There are several miraculous events in the film. For Richard, it is the sudden joy of scoring a goal with an abandoned football. For Rahn, it is seeing Matthias on the sideline that spurs him into scoring the winning goal. For Sepp Herberger, however, the miracles are more mundane: the sudden rain that slows down the Hungarians (however, German captain Fritz Walter tended to perform better in stormy conditions), but not so much the Germans fitted with Adolf Dassler's revolutionary screw-in football studs. For all Germans, it's the unexpected euphoria of a win that heals many wounds, becoming a symbol of the ongoing economic "miracle".

Cast

Lubanski family
 Louis Klamroth - Matthias Lubanski
 Peter Lohmeyer - Richard Lubanski
 Johanna Gastdorf - Christa Lubanski
 Mirko Lang - Bruno Lubanski
 Birthe Wolter - Ingrid Lubanski

Football team
  - Sepp Herberger
  - Helmut Rahn
 Knut Hartwig - Fritz Walter
  - Horst Eckel
 Simon Verhoeven - Ottmar Walter
  - Toni Turek
  - Hans Schäfer

Others
 Katharina Wackernagel - Annette Ackermann
 Lucas Gregorowicz - Paul Ackermann

The real sports miracle

The 1954 German team, captained by Fritz Walter and coached by Sepp Herberger, won the World Cup in a remarkable final against the legendary Hungarian Mighty Magyars, undefeated for four years (Hungary had even thrashed the German back-ups 8–3 in the group stages). A determined Germany came back from an early two-goal deficit to win 3–2, with Helmut Rahn scoring the winning goal six minutes from the end of full-time. This was a euphoric event for Germany, which had been spiritually and economically shattered by the war. Winning the Jules Rimet Trophy by beating the world's strongest team gave the country new pride and is seen as a herald of Germany's economic and political recovery.

Awards
 Prix du Public UBS, Locarno International Film Festival 2003
 Goldene Leinwand
 Deutscher Filmpreis 2004 for Best Picture (Silver), German Film of the Year, German Actor of the Year (Peter Lohmeyer)
 Bavarian Film Award 2004 to Sönke Wortmann as Best Director and to Johanna Gastdorf as Best Supporting Actress

References

External links

Review of the film in English
"Mourning the Miracle of Bern" from Deutsche Welle, 2003 article
"The legendary radio annotator from Herbert Zimmermann (RealMedia)"
IMCDB – Internet Movie Car Database

2000s sports films
Films directed by Sönke Wortmann
Films produced by Sönke Wortmann
German association football films
Sports films based on actual events
Films set in 1954
Films set in West Germany
Films set in Switzerland
Films shot in Cologne
1954 FIFA World Cup
Football mass media in Germany
West Germany at the 1954 FIFA World Cup
2000s German films
2000s German-language films